State Road 100 (AR 100, Ark. 100, and Hwy. 100) is a former state highway in Northwest Arkansas. The route began at US Highway 71 (US 71) in Bentonville and ran north to Route 88 at the Missouri state line. The entire highway was supplanted by US 71 in 1960 following Missouri's construction of a new terrain route. State Road 100 was maintained by the Arkansas Highway Department (AHD), now known as the Arkansas Department of Transportation (ArDOT).

History
The route was created during the 1926 Arkansas state highway numbering as an original state highway. It was deleted in 1960, following AASHTO approval of a US 71 alignment change, replacing the entire route.

Major intersections

See also

References

Transportation in Benton County, Arkansas
100 1926
U.S. Route 71
Bentonville, Arkansas